Regional 1 South West (formerly South West Premier and National League 3 South West) is a level five league in the English rugby union system. It is one of six leagues at this level. When this division began in 1987 it was known as South West Division 1. The format of the league was changed at the beginning of the 2009–10 season following reorganisation by the Rugby Football Union, and the name change from National League 3 to South West Premier was introduced for the 2017–18 season by the RFU in order to lessen confusion for what is a series of regional leagues. Regional 1 South West, is the highest regional rugby union league covering South West England. The club finishing in first place is automatically promoted to National League 2 West. Relegated teams drop down to either Regional 2 South West or Regional 2 Severn, depending on location.

Exeter University are the current champions.

Format
The season runs from September to May and comprises twenty-two rounds of matches, with each club playing each of its rivals, home and away. The results of the matches contribute points to the league as follows:
    4 points are awarded for a win
    2 points are awarded for a draw
    0 points are awarded for a loss, however
    1 losing (bonus) point is awarded to a team that loses a match by 7 points or fewer
    1 additional (bonus) point is awarded to a team scoring 4 tries or more in a match

Current season

Participating teams and locations

2021–22
The first matches were played on 4 September 2021 and the final league matches on 23 April 2022. Exeter University (as champions), Old Redcliffians (as runner-up) and Hornets (3rd) are all promoted to National League 2 West (formerly National League 2 South). The RFU will announce the format of the tier 5 leagues during the summer of 2022.

Participating teams
Nine of the fourteen teams participated in the previous competition (2019–20). The champions, Barnstaple were promoted to National League 2 South, while Newbury and Bracknell were both relegated to South West 1 East. Maidenhead have been level transferred to London & South East Premier. The teams coming into this seasons competition are Old Redcliffians and Bournemouth, both relegated from National League 2 South in 15th and 16th position respectively. Teams promoted into this seasons competition are Hornets, champions of South West 1 West, and two teams from South West 1 East, Royal Wootton Bassett and Old Centralians (1st and 2nd respectively).

Final league table

2020–21 
Due to the ongoing pandemic, the 2020–21 season was cancelled.

2019–20 
The season ended before all the matches were completed because of the coronavirus pandemic and the RFU used a best playing record formula to decide the final table. Barnstaple are the champions.

Participating teams 
Ten of the thirteen teams participated in last season's competition. They are joined by three promoted sides; Launceston, Newbury Blues and Okehampton. Bournemouth were promoted to National League 2 South, while relegated sides included Newton Abbot and Cleve (both South West 1 West), and Old Patesians (South West 1 East). Initially, Bromsgrove were due to be level transferred from Midlands Premier but the withdrawal of Birmingham & Solihull from the league system meant that they stayed put, leaving South West Premier with just thirteen teams.

Final league table

2018–19

Participating teams 
Nine of the fourteen teams participated in last season's competition. They are joined by Barnstaple, who were relegated from National League 2 South, and by three promoted sides; Drybrook, Exeter University and Old Patesians. Dings Crusaders (last seasons champions) were promoted to National League 2 South, while Hornets and Lydney were both relegated to South West 1 West, and Newbury Blues relegated to South West 1 East.

Final league table

Promotion play-off 
Each season, the runners-up in the South West Premier (formerly National League 3 South West) and London & South East Premier (National League 3 London & South East) participate in a play-off for the third promotion place to National League 2 South. The team with the best playing record, in this case Westcliff, hosted the match and beat their opponents Barnstaple 44 – 5  to win promotion to National League 2 South for the first time. This was Westcliff's first appearance in the play-offs and Barnstaple's second; in 2016 Barnstaple beat Tonbridge Juddians 31 – 30 at Tonbridge. The home team have won fifteen out of 19 play-off matches and the south-east team have won the play-off thirteen times.

2017–18

Participating teams 
Ten of the fourteen teams participated in last season's competition (when it was known as National League 3 South West). They are joined by Exmouth, who were relegated from National League 2 South, and by three promoted sides; Weston-super-Mare, Maidenhead and Newbury Blues. Old Redcliffians (champions) were promoted to National League 2 South, while Launceston were relegated to

Final league table

Promotion play-off 
Each season, the runners-up in the South West Premier (formerly National League 3 South West) and London & South East Premier (formerly National League 3 London & SE) participate in a play-off for the third promotion place to National League 2 South. The team with the best playing record, in this case Guernsey, hosted the match and beat their opponents Bournemouth 38 – 23 to win promotion. This was Guernsey's first appearance in the play-offs and Bournemouth's second. Bournemouth's previous appearance was in 2011 when they lost to Hertford 23 – 22.

2016–17 
Nine of the fourteen teams participated in last season's competition. They are joined by Launceston who were relegated from National League 2 South, and by two promoted sides: Camborne and Salisbury. Exmouth (champions) and Barnstaple (play-off) were promoted to National League 2 South, while Chippenham were relegated to South West 1 West, and Old Patesians and Old Centralians to South West 1 East. To address a league imbalance due to only one team coming down from National League 2 South, both Bromsgrove and Bracknell have been level transferred into the league from National League 3 Midlands and National League 3 London & SE respectively, Bromsgrove having finished 9th and Bracknell 11th.

Final league table

Promotion play-off 
Each season, the runners-up in the National League 3 London & SE, and National League 3 South West participate in a play-off for the third promotion place to National League 2 South. The team with the best playing record, in this case Wimbledon, hosted the match and destroyed their opponents Dings Crusaders 55 – 5 to win promotion.

2015–16 
Nine of the fourteen teams participated in last season's competition. They are joined by two teams relegated from National League 2 South, Dings Crusaders and Lydney; and by three promoted teams Cleve, Chippenham and Ivybridge. The teams leaving the league were the 2014–15 champions, Redingensians who were promoted to National League 2 South and the relegated teams, Chard and Weston-super-Mare to play in South West 1 West, and Oxford Harlequins to South West 1 East. Bracknell, who finished 3rd last season, transferred to National League 3 London and SE.

Participating teams

Final league table

Promotion play-off 
Each season, the runners-up in the National League 3 London and SE, and National League 3 South West participate in a play-off for promotion to National League 2 South. The team with the best playing record, in this case Tonbridge Juddians, host the match and their opponents were Barnstaple, who won the match 30 – 31, scoring the winning points with a penalty in the last seconds of the match.

2014–15

Participating teams

Final league table

Promotion play-off 
Each season, the runners-up in the National League 3 London and SE, and National League 3 South West participate in a play-off for promotion to National League 2 South. The team with the best playing record, in this case Exmouth, hosts the match; their opponents were Barnes and the match was played on 25 April 2015. At the end of full-time the match score was 22 – 22, and Barnes scored the only points in extra-time, to win the match 27– 22.

After extra time (80 mins: 22 – 22)

2013–14 
 Amersham & Chiltern RFC
 Avonmouth Old Boys
 Barnstaple
 Bracknell (promoted from South West 1 East)
 Brixham
 Chippenham
 Lydney (relegated from National League 2 South)
 Newton Abbot
 Old Centralians (promoted from South West 1 East)
 Old Patesians
 Old Redcliffians (promoted from South West 1 West)
 Redingensians
 Weston-super-Mare
 Worcester Wanderers (promoted from Midlands 1 West)

League winners 
 Lydney (promoted to National League 2 South)

Relegated 
 Avonmouth Old Boys (relegated to South West 1 West)
 Chippenham (relegated to South West 1 East)
 Worcester Wanderers (relegated to Midlands 1 West)

Transferred 
 Amersham & Chiltern RFC (transferred to National League 3 London & SE)

Final league table

2012–13 
Amersham & Chiltern RFC
Avonmouth Old Boys
Barnstaple
Brixham
Chippenham
Exmouth
London Irish Amateur (transferred from National League 3 London & SE)
Maidenhead (promoted from South West 1 East)
Malvern
Newton Abbot
Old Patesians
Oxford Harlequins
Redingensians
Weston-super-Mare

2011–12 
Amersham & Chiltern RFC
Barnstaple
Bournemouth
Bridgwater & Albion
Chinnor
Chippenham
Exmouth
Newbury Blues (relegated from National League 2 South)
Newton Abbot
Old Patesians
Old Redcliffians
Oxford Harlequins
Redingensians
Weston-super-Mare

2010–11 
Barnstaple
Bournemouth
Bridgwater & Albion
Cheltenham
Chinnor
Cleve
Coney Hill
Exmouth
Hartpury College
Newton Abbot
Old Patesians
Oxford Harlequins
Redingensians
Weston-super-Mare

2009–10 
The first season as a national league

Barnstaple
Bournemouth
Chinnor
Chippenham
Cleve
Coney Hill
Exmouth
Maidenhead (promoted from South West 1 East)
Old Patesians
Oxford Harlequins
Reading
Redingensians
Taunton
Weston-super-Mare

2007–08

Final league table

Original teams 
When league rugby began in 1987 this division contained the following teams:

Bournemouth
Bridgwater & Albion
Clifton
High Wycombe
Oxford
Maidenhead
Redruth
St Ives
Taunton
Torquay Athletic
Weston-super-Mare

South West Premier honours 
In the first season of the English rugby union league pyramid, sponsored by Courage, there was four, tier five leagues. The geographical area for teams in South West Division One covered an area of south-west England from Oxfordshire and Berkshire in the east to Cornwall in the west. There were eleven teams in the league and they played each team once, giving each team ten matches. The other tier five leagues were London 1, Midlands 1 and North 1. This system prevailed for five seasons, and in 1992–93 the number of teams increased from eleven to thirteen. The following season (1993–94) the league was reorganised and the four tier five leagues became two; National 5 North and National 5 South. After three seasons, in 1996–97, a further reorganisation occurred, and there was a return to four, tier five leagues; with South West Division One covering the area of south-west England from Berkshire westwards. This system prevailed until 2009–10 when the number of teams was increased from twelve to fourteen and renamed National League Three South West. There was a name change for the beginning of season 2017–18 when the division was renamed the South West Premier.

South West 1 (1987–1993)
The original South West 1 was a tier 5 league with promotion up to Area League 2 South and relegation down to South West 2 (presently split into two leagues known as South West 1 East and South West 1 West).

South West 1 (1993–96)
The top six teams from South West 1 and the top six from London 1 were combined to create National 5 South.  South West 1 dropped to become a tier six league and was one of two feeder leagues for National 5 South.  Relegation continued to South West 2 (currently South West 1 East and South West 1 West).

South West 1 (1996–2009)
At the end of the 1995–96 season National 5 South was discontinued and South West 1 returned to being a tier 5 league.  Promotion was up to National 4 South (now known as National League 2 South), while the splitting of South West 2 into two regional divisions, meant that relegation was now down to either South West 2 East or South West 2 West (currently South West 1 East / South West 1 West).

National League 3 South West (2009–2017)
The division was renamed National League 3 South West following a restructuring of the national leagues which led to changes at all levels.  It remained a tier 5 league with promotion up to National League 2 South (formerly National League 3 South) and relegation to either South West 1 East or South West 1 West (formerly South West 2 East / South West 2 West).

South West Premier (2017–2022)
For the 2017–18 season all divisions at tier 5 were renamed from National League 3 to Premier meaning that National League 3 South West became known as South West Premier. Promotion continued to National League 2 South and relegation to either South West 1 East or South West 1 West.

Promotion play-offs
From 2000–01 season there has been a promotion play-off game between the runners-up of London & South East Premier and South West Premier for the third and final promotion place to National League 2 South, with the team with the superior league record having home advantage. As of the 2018–19 season, the London and south-east teams have been most successful with thirteen wins to the south-west teams six, while the home side have won fifteen of the nineteen ties. The last play-off was in 2018–19, with the next two seasons cancelled due to the COVID-19 pandemic in the United Kingdom and following the increase of leagues at this level to three, only the champions are promoted.

Number of league titles

Bournemouth (2)
Chinnor (2)
Clifton (2)
Dings Crusaders (2)
Reading (2)
Barnstaple (1)
Berry Hill (1)
Bracknell (1)
Bridgwater & Albion (1)
Cheltenham (1)
Cinderford (1)
Exeter University (1)
Exmouth (1)
Hartpury College (1)
Henley (1)
High Wycombe (1)
Launceston (1)
London Irish Amateur (1)
Lydney (1)
Maidenhead (1)
Mounts Bay (1)
Newbury (1)
Old Patesians (1)
Old Redcliffians (1)
Penzance & Newlyn (1)
Redingensians (1)
Redruth (1)
Taunton (1)
Weston-super-Mare (1)

Note

See also
 South West Division RFU
 English rugby union system
 Rugby union in England

References

External links 
 Rugby union in the South West
 South West Premier fixtures at the RFU

5
Recurring sporting events established in 1987
Sports leagues established in 1987